Juan Boria (February 17, 1905 – May 29, 1995) also known as the Negro Verse Pharaoh, was a Puerto Rican poet known for his Afro-Caribbean poetry.

Biography

Early years
Juan Boria Romero was born on February 17, 1906, in Dorado, Puerto Rico to Juan Boria Nevárez, a sugar factory engineer, and Anselma Romero Sempri, a housewife. He was of predominant African ancestry and of partial Italian ancestry through his mother. He took his elementary studies in Dorado. After that, he followed studies in the nearby town of Toa Baja. During weekends, he worked as a mason and carpenter to pay for his studies. He finished his studies in Santurce in 1923.

At this time, his family moved to the town of Cataño and he started studies in the University of Puerto Rico in Río Piedras. He received his bachelor's degree as a teacher of industrial arts, drawing, and carpentry. After several years working in several places, he started working as a teacher in 1937 at a school in San Germán. From there, he was transferred to another school in Canóvanas.

Starting his career
In 1938, during a show at the school in Canóvanas, he heard a colleague — Pablito Rivera — recite the Negro poem "La negra curandera." He liked it so much that he asked him for a copy to learn and recite at his friends meetings. After some time, his friends prompted him to participate in a program at the WKAQ radio station. The poet Fortunato Vizcarrondo, considered the most important Negro poet in the island at the time, heard him and visited him. Vizcarrondo then offered him other of his poems for him to recite at the program.

In 1941, he participated in a show at Loíza, where he met the most important personality in Puerto Rican show-business, Ramón Rivero (known as "Diplo"), who was so impressed with Boria's performance that he made Boria part of his troupe called La Farándula Bohemia, traveling the island and performing as a poet and as an actor. In 1944, Boria once more joined the famous troupe and accompanied Ramón Rivero (Diplo) to the Panama Canal to entertain Puerto Rican soldiers stationed there.

International fame
In 1950, he traveled to Havana, Cuba under the recommendation of "Diplo" and Luis Palés Matos. He planned to stay there for 15 days but was so sought after that he ended up staying two months. He followed with travels to the Dominican Republic, Colombia, Venezuela, Spain, and Portugal, as well as New York, where he headlined at the Teatro Puerto Rico, and other cities in the United States. Afterward, he alternated his artistic activities with his job as a teacher in Río Piedras.

In 1954, Boria debuted in television on the show Tribuna del Arte from Telemundo. He also performed in La Taberna India with "Diplo." He followed with his debut in film in 1964 in the Mexican/Puerto Rican film Mientras Puerto Rico duerme, directed by Julián Soler. He also appeared in several short films produced by the Division of Community Education.

From 1965 he traveled several cultural centers, schools, and public squares in Puerto Rico reciting at events sponsored by the Puerto Rican Culture Institute. He also participated at the Cultural Olympics in 1979.

Recognitions
In October, 1980, the 7th Festival of Bomba y Plena celebrated in his hometown of Dorado was dedicated to him. Also, the show Nuestra Noche that same year was held in his honor. The show was celebrated in the Roberto Clemente Coliseum and featured singers like Wilkins, Haciendo Punto en Otro Son, and others.

In 1983, the mayor of Dorado, Alfonso López Chaar, acquired the Juana de Arco Theater at the entrance of the town and renamed it as Juan Boria Theater. On November 1, 1984, Boria himself presented his first show at the theater.

Boria retired from teaching in 1974. Afterward, he started his own shop in Cupey.

Boria died May 29, 1995, in Río Piedras, Puerto Rico.

Personal life
Boria married Emérita Rodríguez in 1941 with whom he had two daughters: Norma and Zayda. He also had another son: Cruz Amanda, his oldest daughter.

Influences
Although he identified with the works of Vizcarrondo, Palés Matos and Nicolás Guillén, his repertoire included poems from:
 Emilio Ballagas
 Félix B. Caignet
 Gonzalo Castañón
 Marcelino Arozamena
 Lorenzo Coballés
 Alfonso Camín
 Pablo Motito
 Gilberto Hernández Santana
 Enrique Montijo
 María Teresa Vallés
 Luis Manuel Ruiz
 Rubén Suro

Discography
 ¡Qué negrota! (Mar-Vela, MVLP-107)

References

See also

List of Puerto Ricans
List of Puerto Ricans of African descent

1900s births
1995 deaths
People from Dorado, Puerto Rico
Puerto Rican poets
Puerto Rican male writers
20th-century American poets
University of Puerto Rico alumni
20th-century American male writers